An optical link is a telecommunications link that consists of a single end-to-end optical circuit. A cable of optical fibers, possibly concatenated into a dark fiber link, is the simplest form of an optical link.

Other forms of optical link can include single-"colour" links over a wavelength division multiplex infrastructure, and/or links that use optical amplifiers to compensate for attenuation over long distances. 

Other forms of optical links include free-space optical telecommunication links.

In the rail transport sector, optical links are used in two forms depending on whether the feeding station is a main station or not. Thus main stations are called 'long halls', and all remaining stations are said to be 'short halls'.

See also 

100 Gigabit Ethernet
10 Gigabit Ethernet
Active cable
Cloud computing
CXP (connector)
C form-factor pluggable
Data center
Fibre channel
Fiber-optic communication
Green computing
HDMI
High-performance computing
InfiniBand
InfiniBand Trade Association
Interconnect bottleneck
Light Peak
List of device bandwidths
Optical communication
Optical cable
Optoelectronics
Parallel optical interface
Photo diode
PIN diode
PCI Express
Small form-factor pluggable transceiver
Terabit Ethernet
Transimpedance amplifier
VCSEL

References 

Optical communications